WPTH is a Christian radio station licensed to Olney, Illinois, broadcasting on 88.1 MHz FM.  The station is owned by VCY America.

Programming
WPTH's programming includes Christian Talk and Teaching programming including; Crosstalk, Worldview Weekend with Brannon Howse, Grace to You with John MacArthur, In Touch with Dr. Charles Stanley, Love Worth Finding with Adrian Rogers, Revive Our Hearts with Nancy Leigh DeMoss, The Alternative with Tony Evans, Liberty Council's Faith and Freedom Report, Thru the Bible with J. Vernon McGee, Joni and Friends, Unshackled!, and Moody Radio's Stories of Great Christians.

WPTH also airs a variety of vocal and instrumental traditional Christian Music, as well as children's programming such as Ranger Bill.

History
The station began broadcasting in July 1992. The station was owned by Olney Voice of Christian Faith and aired a Christian format. In 2011, the station was donated to VCY America.

See also
 VCY America
 Vic Eliason
 List of VCY America Radio Stations

References

External links
 VCY America official website
 

PTH
Radio stations established in 1992
1992 establishments in Illinois
VCY America stations